Babatunde Oluwasegun Temitope Oluwakorede Adisa "Baba" Oshinowo, Jr. [Ba-ba-TOON-day OH-shi-no-who] (born January 14, 1983) is a former American football defensive tackle. His second name "Oluwasegun" means "God has been victorious" in the Yoruba language.  He was drafted by the Cleveland Browns in the sixth round of the 2006 NFL Draft. He played college football at Stanford.

Oshinowo has also been a member of the Chicago Bears, Washington Redskins, Philadelphia Eagles, Carolina Panthers and San Francisco 49ers.

Early years
Oshinowo played high school football at Neuqua Valley High School in Naperville, Illinois, where he was known as "OJ" Oshinowo. He was an All-Prep American as a Senior in defense at Neuqua. He holds two track and field records at Neuqua, one for shot put and one for discus.  At Stanford, Oshinowo obtained a bachelor's degree in electrical engineering.

Professional career

Cleveland Browns
On September 19, 2006, Cleveland signed Oshinowo from their practice squad. He was active for three games and played in the season finale against the Houston Texans, recording two tackles.

Chicago Bears
On September 19, 2007 the Chicago Bears signed Oshinowo to their practice squad. He was signed to the Bears active roster with three games remaining in the 2007 season. The Bears waived Oshinowo on May 7, 2008.

Washington Redskins
On July 29, 2008, the Washington Redskins signed Oshinowo and waived defensive tackle Zarnell Fitch. He was waived by the team on August 24.

Philadelphia Eagles
Oshinowo was signed to the practice squad of the Philadelphia Eagles on November 19, 2008 after linebacker Andy Studebaker was signed by the Kansas City Chiefs.

Carolina Panthers
Oshinowo signed a future contract with the Carolina Panthers on January 28, 2009. He was waived on June 26, 2009.

San Francisco 49ers
Oshinowo was signed by the San Francisco 49ers on July 30, 2009. Oshinowo was waived by the 49ers on August 7 after the team signed wide receiver Chris Francies.

References

External links
Chicago Bears bio
Philadelphia Eagles bio
San Francisco 49ers bio
Stanford Cardinal bio
Official Website

1983 births
Living people
Nigerian players of American football
Players of American football from Illinois
American football defensive tackles
Stanford Cardinal football players
Cleveland Browns players
Chicago Bears players
Washington Redskins players
Philadelphia Eagles players
Carolina Panthers players
San Francisco 49ers players
Sportspeople from Naperville, Illinois
American sportspeople of Nigerian descent
American people of Yoruba descent
Yoruba sportspeople